Golestan Park is a historical park in Tabriz, Iran. The park is located near to Qonqa Square in city center. The place, which was originally used as a public cemetery, was changed to a city park during the second Pahlavi era.

A marble clock tower, which has been devastated recently, had been founded at the front of main entrance of the park.

See also 
Gajil

Parks in Tabriz